The eighth season of Survivor Greece, the Greek version of the popular reality show Survivor, began airing on December 27, 2020 on Skai TV and also in Cyprus on Sigma TV. Giorgos Lianos will host alone for the first time, as Sakis Tanimanidis decided not to be a host for this season, due to his wife's pregnancy. Ten players and ten celebrities, who have been known in Greece through their work, are invited to survive on a deserted island, the exotic La Romana in Dominican Republic, having their luggage, the necessary clothes and basic food supply.

For the first time in the show, the nominations for the elimination can be from both tribes in each week. The TV viewers votes for their favorite player and not favorite player. The Most Popular player by the public vote will have immunity and must give a name to be nominated for eviction. Then all contestants have to nominate and then two are nominated for eviction, the player with the less votes from the previous TV viewers votes is eliminated. Since week 5, the voting system changed. So, a player is immuted if he won a challenge for the immunity and won't be voted by his tribe. Also, the player will be eliminated if he has the fewest votes to be saved from the public vote between the nominated players and not from the Most Popular Player voting. This is also the same voting system, as in the last three previous seasons.

Contestants
The names of the original tribes were Mαχητές (Machites, meaning warriors), and Διάσημοι (Diasimoi,  meaning celebrities). On the first week 20 contestants entered the game. On the second week, Anthi Salagoudi and Asimina Igglezou entered the game. On the third week, Elizabeth Elechi entered the game. In Episode 14, the tribes were switched, so the new tribe are the Red Tribe and the Blue Tribe. On the fifth week, Marianthi Kasdagli and Valeria Chopsonidou entered the game. On the sixth week, Ilias Bogdanos, Dimitris Makropoulos and Carolina Kalyva entered the game. On the ninth week, Christina Kefala, George Tavladakis, Nikoleta Mavridi, Pavlos Galakteros and Sakis Katsoulis entered the game. On the tenth week, Eleni Chamberi entered the game as the last player. In Episode 57 the Tribes are switched again and created the new Red tribe and the new Blue tribe.

Voting history

Nominations table

Matches

Team matches

Ratings
Official ratings are taken from AGB Hellas.

Notes

References

2020 Greek television seasons
2021 Greek television seasons
08
Television shows filmed in the Dominican Republic